Wenceslaus Johann Gustav Karsten (15 December 1732 – 17 April 1787) was a German mathematician. In 1768, Karsten published a graphic representation of infinitely many logarithms of real and complex numbers. He was a professor of Mathematics at the Universities of Rostock, Bützow and Halle.

Education and early life 
He was born Neubrandenburg but grew up with his grandfather in Güstrow where he attended high school. From 1750 he studied theology at the Universities in Rostock and Jena but also heard lectures on mathematics and philosophy. In 1754 he returned to Güstrow with the aim to become a priest. As he heard the University of Rostock was in need of a mathematician, he returned to the University of Rostock and also graduated in mathematics in February 1755. The same year he lectured on mathematics at the same University. Not satisfied with his salary, he unsuccessfully applied as a teacher at high schools in Hamburg and Stettin. After in 1758 the professor of logic  died, he was able to succeed him.

Professional career 
In 1760, after a dispute between Frederick II, Duke of Mecklenburg-Schwerin and the University of the appointment of a new professor of theology, lead the former to establish a new University in Bützow. Karsten, who was paid by the Duke, had to teach at the new University. Again, his financial situation was not as wished, and in 1763 Karsten wrote to Johann Euler, a son of Leonhard Euler, that he would like to become a lecturer in Saint Petersburg. In 1764 he was offered an employment at the University of Helmstedt. Still teaching at Bützow, he also received a call to Saint Petersburg in 1765. But after the Duke raised his salary significantly, Karsten turned both job offers down and stayed at Bützow. In 1778, after the death of Johann Andreas Segner, a Professor at the University of Halle, Karsten became Segners successor. In Halle he turned his interest to the natural sciences and chemistry. In 1783 his assistent became Friedrich Albrecht Carl Gren, who would later become a prominent figure in the field of chemistry. Karsten is credited with raising chemistry to an equally accepted department beside the physics at the universities. Karsten died in 1787.

References

Further reading 

Wolfgang Engel. Angela Hartwig, Tilmann Schmidt (editors): Die Rektoren der Universität Rostock - 1419-2000. In: ''Beiträge zur Geschichte der Universität Rostock. Heft 23. Universitätsdruckerei Rostock-Universitätsarchiv 2000. .

External links 
Catalogus Professorum Rostochiensium
Wenceslaus Johann Gustav Karsten (1732-1787) University of Halle Biography

1732 births
1787 deaths
People from Neubrandenburg
18th-century German mathematicians
University of Rostock alumni
Academic staff of the University of Halle